Sergio Ghiatto (3 June 1928 – 29 June 2012) was an Italian rower. He competed in the men's eight event at the 1952 Summer Olympics.

References

1928 births
2012 deaths
Italian male rowers
Olympic rowers of Italy
Rowers at the 1952 Summer Olympics